Olearia elaeophila is a species of flowering plant in the family Asteraceae and is endemic to the south-west of Western Australia. It is a small shrub with scattered linear leaves, and white or blue and yellow, daisy-like inflorescences.

Description
Its stems and leaves are covered with cobwebby or woolly hairs. Both surfaces of the leaves are more or less glabrous. Flowering occurs in April and May and the fruit is a densely hairy achene, the pappus with 18 to 29 long bristles and a smaller number of short ones.

Taxonomy
This daisy bush was first formally described in 1836 by Augustin Pyramus de Candolle who gave it the name Eurybia elaeophila in his Prodromus Systematis Naturalis Regni Vegetabilis, based on an unpublished description by Allan Cunningham. In 1867 George Bentham changed that name to Olearia elaeophila in Flora Australiensis. The specific epithet (elaeophila) means "marsh-loving".

Distribution and habitat
Olearia elaeophila grows in sedge, heath, shrubland, woodland and forest in winter-wet places  in the Avon Wheatbelt, Jarrah Forest, Swan Coastal Plain and Warren biogeographic regions of south-western Western Australia.

Conservation status
This daisy bush is listed as "not threatened" by the Department of Biodiversity, Conservation and Attractions.

References

elaeophila
Flora of Western Australia
Taxa named by Augustin Pyramus de Candolle
Plants described in 1836